Chaos is the seventh studio album by American Nu metalcore band Attila. The album was released on November 4, 2016, through SharpTone Records. It is the band's only release on the label after leaving Artery Recordings, and is the first to be produced by Erik Ron, succeeding long-time producer Joey Sturgis. This is the last Attila album to feature Sean Heenan on drums.

Track listing

Personnel

Attila
Chris "Fronz" Fronzak – vocals
Chris Linck – guitars
Kalan Blehm – bass
Sean Heenan – drums
Hollywood Undead (with Attila) – background vocals

Production
Erik Ron – production and mixing
Ue Nastasi – mastering

Charts

References 

2016 albums
Attila (metalcore band) albums
SharpTone Records albums
Albums produced by Erik Ron